If It's All Right with You/Just What I've Been Looking For is a studio album by American country music artist Dottie West. It was released in May 1973 on RCA Victor Records and was produced by Jerry Bradley. The project was West's 20th studio recording in her music career. It consisted of ten tracks, two of which became minor hits on the country charts in 1973. The album's contemporary sound helped modernize West's music, bringing the album to chart on the Billboard country albums survey in 1973.

Background and content
If It's All Right with You/Just What I've Been Looking For marked ten years of West recording with the RCA Victor label. To commemorate her anniversary, producer Jerry Bradley brought in a more modern sound, unlike her previous album releases. Bradley brought in songwriter Kenny O'Dell to compose two songs for the project. He also wrote the liner notes. "Country-Pop, country-rock, country-folk, country-funk -- an on and on and on. All the tags and labels we need to identify and pigeonhole the ever-changing music scene. At least we try," O'Dell said in response to the album's new sound. West also remarried during this time. Her new husband is included on the album cover (Byron Metcalf).

The project was a collection of ten newly-recorded tracks by West. Among the album's tracks was a cover of Tanya Tucker's "Delta Dawn" and Roberta Flack's pop hit "Killing Me Softly with His Song". O'Dell composed the album's two singles, along with co-writer Larry Henley. Also brought in to contribute tracks was Larry Gatlin, who was a new recording artist by this point. A few years prior, West had discovered Gatlin after being impressed by his songwriting. This led to his own recording contract. Also included is the track "I'm Your Country Girl". The song was the basis for a commercial jingle West composed for Coca-Cola.

Release and reception

If It's All Right with You/Just What I've Been Looking For was released in May 1973 on RCA Victor Records, making it West's 20th studio album. It was issued as a vinyl LP, consisting of five songs on each side of the record. It became West's first album in three years to make the Billboard Top Country Albums chart, reaching number 37 by July 23, 1973. The album was reviewed positively by Billboard in May 1973. Writers praised West's voice and vocal delivery. "But it has feeling, plenty of it, and great numbers, which she performs to absolute perfection," they commented.

Two singles were released from the record, one of which became a top 40 hit. The first single spawned was "If It's All Right with You" in October 1972. Spending 11 weeks on the Billboard Hot Country Singles chart, the single peaked at number 28 by February 1973. It was West's first top 40 hit since 1971. "If It's All Right with You" was also West's first entry on the Billboard Hot 100, reaching number 97 in January 1973. Additionally, it was her first single since 1968 to make the Canadian RPM Country Singles chart, reaching number 48. "Just What I've Been Looking For" was released as a single in March 1973. The single only reached number 44 on the country songs chart later that year.

Track listing

Personnel
All credits are adapted from the liner notes of If It's All Right with You/Just What I've Been Looking For.

Musical personnel
 Harold Bradley – bass guitar
 David Briggs – piano
 Jimmy Capps – electric guitar
 Bobby Dyson – bass
 Ray Edenton – acoustic guitar
 Larry Gatlin – background vocals
 Paul Kelley – background vocals
 Charlie McCoy – bass
 Byron Metcalf – drums
 Weldon Myrick – steel guitar
 Hargus "Pig" Robbins – piano
 Dale Sellers – guitar
 Buddy Spicher – fiddle, violin
 Henry Strzelecki – bass
 Jerry Shook – guitar
 Bobby Thompson – banjo
 Dottie West – lead vocals
 Chip Young – guitar

Technical personnel
 Jerry Bradley – producer
 Bill McElhiney – strings
 Jimmy Moore – cover photo
 Mike Shockley – recording technician
 Bill Vandevort – engineering

Chart performance

Release history

References

1974 albums
Albums produced by Jerry Bradley (music executive)
Dottie West albums
RCA Records albums